Nurul Islam Khan was a Bangladeshi politician and the former Member of Parliament of Sylhet-7.

Career
Khan was elected to parliament from Sylhet-7 as an Awami League candidate in 1973. Later he contested as Jatiyo Janata Party Candidate from Sylhet-2.

Death 
He died at private hospital in Sylhet on 21 February, 2023.

References

Awami League politicians
1st Jatiya Sangsad members
Year of birth missing (living people)

2023 deaths
People from Sylhet